Quincannon, Frontier Scout is a 1956 American Western film directed by Lesley Selander and written by John C. Higgins and Don Martin. The film stars Tony Martin, Peggie Castle, John Bromfield, John Smith and Ron Randell. The film was released in May 1956, by United Artists.

Plot

Cast 
 Tony Martin as Linus Quincannon
 Peggie Castle as Maylene Mason
 John Bromfield as Lt. Burke
 John Smith as Lt. Phil Hostedder
 Ron Randell as Capt. Bell
 John Doucette as Sgt. Calvin
 Morris Ankrum as Col. Harry Conover
 Peter Mamakos as Blackfoot Sam
 Edmund Hashim as Iron Wolf
 Tom London as Livery Stableman (uncredited)

Production
Parts of the film were shot in Kanab Canyon in Utah, as well as in Pipe Springs, Arizona.

References

External links 
 
 Review of film at Variety

1956 films
1950s English-language films
United Artists films
American Western (genre) films
1956 Western (genre) films
Films directed by Lesley Selander
Films set in Montana
Films shot in Utah
Films shot in Arizona
1950s American films